The 1910–11 Bucknell Bison men's basketball team represented Bucknell University during the 1910–11 NCAA men's basketball season. The head coach was George Hoskins, coaching the Bison in his third season.The Bison's team captain was John Kurtz.

Schedule

|-

References

Bucknell Bison men's basketball seasons
Bucknell
Bucknell
Bucknell